

Events

Pre-1600
 484 – King Huneric of the Vandals replaces Nicene bishops with Arian ones, and banishes some to Corsica.
1303 – The English are defeated at the Battle of Roslin, in the First War of Scottish Independence.
1386 – King Charles III of Naples and Hungary is assassinated at Buda.
1525 – A Spanish-Austrian army defeats a French army at the Battle of Pavia.
1527 – Coronation of Ferdinand I as the king of Bohemia in Prague.
1538 – Treaty of Nagyvárad between Holy Roman Emperor Ferdinand I and King John Zápolya of Hungary and Croatia.
1582 – With the papal bull Inter gravissimas, Pope Gregory XIII announces the Gregorian calendar.
1597 – The last battle of the Cudgel War takes place on the Santavuori Hill in Ilmajoki, Ostrobothnia.

1601–1900
1607 – L'Orfeo by Claudio Monteverdi, one of the first works recognized as an opera, receives its première performance.
1711 – Rinaldo by George Frideric Handel, the first Italian opera written for the London stage, is premièred.
1739 – Battle of Karnal: The army of Iranian ruler Nader Shah defeats the forces of the Mughal emperor of India, Muhammad Shah.
1803 – In Marbury v. Madison, the Supreme Court of the United States establishes the principle of judicial review.
1809 – London's Drury Lane Theatre burns to the ground, leaving its owner, Irish writer and politician Richard Brinsley Sheridan, destitute.
1821 – Final stage of the Mexican War of Independence from Spain with Plan of Iguala.
1822 – The first Swaminarayan temple in the world, Shri Swaminarayan Mandir, Ahmedabad, is inaugurated.
1826 – The signing of the Treaty of Yandabo marks the end of the First Anglo-Burmese War.
1831 – The Treaty of Dancing Rabbit Creek, the first removal treaty in accordance with the Indian Removal Act, is proclaimed. The Choctaws in Mississippi cede land east of the river in exchange for payment and land in the West.
1848 – King Louis-Philippe of France abdicates the throne.
1854 – A Penny Red with perforations becomes the first perforated postage stamp to be officially issued for distribution. 
1863 – Arizona is organized as a United States territory.
1868 – Andrew Johnson becomes the first President of the United States to be impeached by the United States House of Representatives. He is later acquitted in the Senate.
1875 – The  hits the Great Barrier Reef and sinks off the Australian east coast, killing approximately 100, including a number of high-profile civil servants and dignitaries.
1876 – The stage première of Peer Gynt, a play by Henrik Ibsen with incidental music by Edvard Grieg, takes place in Christiania (Oslo), Norway.
1881 – China and Russia sign the Sino-Russian Ili Treaty.
1895 – Revolution breaks out in Baire, a town near Santiago de Cuba, beginning the Cuban War of Independence; the war ends along with the Spanish–American War in 1898.

1901–present
1916 – The Governor-General of Korea establishes a clinic called Jahyewon in Sorokdo to segregate Hansen's disease patients. 
1917 – World War I: The U.S. ambassador Walter Hines Page to the United Kingdom is given the Zimmermann Telegram, in which Germany pledges to ensure the return of New Mexico, Texas, and Arizona to Mexico if Mexico declares war on the United States.
1918 – Estonian Declaration of Independence.
1920 – Nancy Astor becomes the first woman to speak in the House of Commons of the United Kingdom following her election as a Member of Parliament (MP) three months earlier.
  1920   – The Nazi Party (NSDAP) was founded by Adolf Hitler in the Hofbräuhaus beer hall in Munich, Germany
1942 – Seven hundred ninety-one Romanian Jewish refugees and crew members are killed after the MV Struma is torpedoed by the Soviet Navy.
  1942   – The Battle of Los Angeles: A false alarm led to an anti-aircraft barrage that lasted into the early hours of February 25.
1945 – Egyptian Premier Ahmad Mahir Pasha is killed in Parliament after reading a decree.
1946 – Colonel Juan Perón, founder of the political movement that became known as Peronism, is elected to his first term as President of Argentina.
1949 – The Armistice Agreements are signed, to formally end the hostilities of the 1948 Arab-Israeli War.
1967 – Cultural Revolution: Zhang Chunqiao announces the dissolution of the Shanghai People's Commune, replacing its local government with a revolutionary committee.
1968 – Vietnam War: The Tet Offensive is halted; South Vietnamese forces led by Ngo Quang Truong recapture the citadel of Hué.
1971 – The All India Forward Bloc holds an emergency central committee meeting after its chairman, Hemantha Kumar Bose, is killed three days earlier. P.K. Mookiah Thevar is appointed as the new chairman.
1976 – The 1976 constitution of Cuba is formally proclaimed.
1978 – The Yuba County Five disappear in California. Four of their bodies are found four months later.
1981 – The 6.7  Gulf of Corinth earthquake affected Central Greece with a maximum Mercalli intensity of VIII (Severe). Twenty-two people were killed, 400 were injured, and damage totaled $812 million.
1983 – A special commission of the United States Congress condemns the Japanese American internment during World War II.
1984 – Tyrone Mitchell perpetrates the 49th Street Elementary School shooting in Los Angeles, killing two children and injuring 12 more.
1989 – United Airlines Flight 811, bound for New Zealand from Honolulu, rips open during flight, blowing nine passengers out of the business-class section.
1991 – Gulf War: Ground troops cross the Saudi Arabian border and enter Iraq, thus beginning the ground phase of the war.
1996 – Two civilian airplanes operated by the Miami-based group Brothers to the Rescue are shot down in international waters by the Cuban Air Force.
1999 – China Southwest Airlines Flight 4509, a Tupolev Tu-154 aircraft, crashes on approach to Wenzhou Longwan International Airport in Wenzhou, Zhejiang, China. All 61 people on board are killed.
2004 – The 6.3  Al Hoceima earthquake strikes northern Morocco with a maximum Mercalli intensity of IX (Violent). At least 628 people are killed, 926 are injured, and up to 15,000 are displaced.
2006 – Philippine President Gloria Macapagal Arroyo declares Proclamation 1017 placing the country in a state of emergency in attempt to subdue a possible military coup.
2007 – Japan launches its fourth spy satellite, stepping up its ability to monitor potential threats such as North Korea.
2008 – Fidel Castro retires as the President of Cuba and the Council of Ministers after 32 years. He remains as head of the Communist Party for another three years.
2015 – A Metrolink train derails in Oxnard, California following a collision with a truck, leaving more than 30 injured.
2016 – Tara Air Flight 193, a de Havilland Canada DHC-6 Twin Otter aircraft, crashed, with 23 fatalities, in Solighopte, Myagdi District, Dhaulagiri Zone, while en route from Pokhara Airport to Jomsom Airport.
2020 – Mahathir Mohamad resigns as Prime Minister of Malaysia following an attempt to replace the Pakatan Harapan government, which triggered the 2020-2022 Malaysian political crisis.
2022 – Days after recognising Donetsk and Luhansk as independent states, Russian president Vladimir Putin orders a full scale invasion of Ukraine.
2023 – HK Model and socialite Abby Choi is found murdered.

Births

Pre-1600
1103 – Emperor Toba of Japan (d. 1156)
1304 – Ibn Battuta, Moroccan jurist
1413 – Louis, Duke of Savoy (d. 1465)
1463 – Giovanni Pico della Mirandola, Italian philosopher (d. 1494)
1494 – Johan Friis, Danish statesman (d. 1570)
1500 – Charles V, Holy Roman Emperor (d. 1558)
1536 – Pope Clement VIII (d. 1605)
1545 – John of Austria (d. 1578)
1553 – Cherubino Alberti, Italian engraver and painter (d. 1615)
1557 – Matthias, Holy Roman Emperor (d. 1619)
1593 – Henry de Vere, 18th Earl of Oxford, English soldier and courtier (d. 1625)
1595 – Maciej Kazimierz Sarbiewski, Polish author and poet (d. 1640)

1601–1900
1604 – Arcangela Tarabotti, Venetian nun and feminist (d. 1652)
1619 – Charles Le Brun, French painter and theorist (d. 1690)
1622 – Johannes Clauberg, German theologian and philosopher (d. 1665)
1709 – Jacques de Vaucanson, French engineer (d. 1782)
1721 – John McKinly, Irish-American physician and politician, 1st Governor of Delaware (d. 1796)
1723 – John Burgoyne, English general and politician (d. 1792)
1736 – Charles Alexander, Margrave of Brandenburg-Ansbach (d. 1806)
1743 – Joseph Banks, English botanist and explorer (d. 1820)
1762 – Charles Frederick Horn, German-English composer and educator (d. 1830)
1767 – Rama II of Siam (d. 1824)
1774 – Prince Adolphus, Duke of Cambridge (d. 1850)
1786 – Martin W. Bates, American lawyer and politician (d. 1869)
  1786   – Wilhelm Grimm, German anthropologist, author, and academic (d. 1859)
1788 – Johan Christian Dahl, Norwegian-German painter (d. 1857)
1827 – Lydia Becker, English-French activist (d. 1890)
1831 – Leo von Caprivi, German general and politician, Chancellor of Germany (d. 1899)
1835 – Julius Vogel, English-New Zealand journalist and politician, 8th Prime Minister of New Zealand (d. 1899)
1836 – Winslow Homer, American painter and illustrator (d. 1910)
1837 – Rosalía de Castro, Spanish poet (d. 1885)
1842 – Arrigo Boito, Italian journalist, author, and composer (d. 1918)
1848 – Andrew Inglis Clark, Australian engineer, lawyer, and politician (d. 1907)
1852 – George Moore, Irish author, poet, and playwright (d. 1933)
1868 – Édouard Alphonse James de Rothschild, French financier and polo player (d. 1949)
1869 – Zara DuPont, American suffragist (d. 1946)
1874 – Honus Wagner, American baseball player, coach, and manager (d. 1955)
1877 – Rudolph Ganz, Swiss pianist, composer, and conductor (d. 1972)
  1877   – Ettie Rout, Australian-New Zealand educator and activist (d. 1936)
1885 – Chester W. Nimitz, American admiral (d. 1966)
  1885   – Stanisław Ignacy Witkiewicz, Polish author, poet, and painter (d. 1939)
1890 – Marjorie Main, American actress (d. 1975)
1896 – Richard Thorpe, American director and screenwriter (d. 1991)
1898 – Kurt Tank, German pilot and engineer (d. 1983)
1900 – Irmgard Bartenieff, German-American dancer and physical therapist, leading pioneer of dance therapy (d. 1981)

1901–present
1903 – Vladimir Bartol, Italian-Slovene author and playwright (d. 1967)
1908 – Telford Taylor, American general, lawyer, and historian (d. 1998)
1909 – August Derleth, American anthologist and author (d. 1971)
1914 – Ralph Erskine, English-Swedish architect, designed The Ark and Byker Wall (d. 2005)
  1914   – Weldon Kees, American author, poet, painter, and pianist (d. 1955)
1915 – Jim Ferrier, Australian golfer (d. 1986)
1919 – John Carl Warnecke, American architect (d. 2010)
1921 – Abe Vigoda, American actor (d. 2016)
1922 – Richard Hamilton, English painter and academic (d. 2011)
  1922   – Steven Hill, American actor (d. 2016)
1924 – Hal Herring, American football player and coach (d. 2014)
  1924   – Erik Nielsen, Canadian lawyer and politician, 3rd Deputy Prime Minister of Canada (d. 2008)
1925 – Bud Day, American colonel and pilot, Medal of Honor recipient (d. 2013)
  1926   – Dave Sands, Australian boxer (d. 1952)
1927 – Emmanuelle Riva, French actress (d. 2017)
1929 – Kintaro Ohki, South Korean wrestler (d. 2006)
1930 – Barbara Lawrence, American model and actress (d. 2013)
1931 – Dominic Chianese, American actor and singer
  1931   – Brian Close, English cricketer and coach (d. 2015)
1932 – Michel Legrand, French pianist, composer, and conductor (d. 2019)
  1932   – Zell Miller, American sergeant and politician, 79th Governor of Georgia (d. 2018)
  1932   – John Vernon, Canadian-American actor (d. 2005)
1933 – Judah Folkman, American physician and biologist (d. 2008)
  1933   – Ali Mazrui, Kenyan-American political scientist, philosopher, and academic (d. 2014)
  1933   – David "Fathead" Newman, American saxophonist and composer (d. 2009)
1934 – Bettino Craxi, Italian lawyer and politician, 45th Prime Minister of Italy (d. 2000)
  1934   – Johnny Hills, English footballer (d. 2021)
  1934   – Renata Scotto, Italian soprano 
1935 – Ryhor Baradulin, Belarusian poet, essayist, and translator (d. 2014)
1936 – Guillermo O'Donnell, Argentine political scientist (d. 2011)
  1936   – Carol D'Onofrio, American public health researcher (d. 2020)
1938 – James Farentino, American actor (d. 2012)
  1938   – Phil Knight, American businessman and philanthropist, co-founded Nike, Inc.
1939 – Jamal Nazrul Islam, Bangladeshi physicist and cosmologist (d. 2013)
1940 – Pete Duel, American actor (d. 1971)
  1940   – Jimmy Ellis, American boxer (d. 2014)
  1940   – Denis Law, Scottish footballer and sportscaster
1941 – Joanie Sommers, American singer and actress
1942 – Paul Jones, English singer, harmonica player, and actor
  1942   – Celia Kaye, American actress
  1942   – Joe Lieberman, American lawyer and politician
  1942   – Gayatri Chakravorty Spivak, Indian philosopher, theorist, and academic
1943 – Kent Haruf, American novelist (d. 2014)
  1943   – Gigi Meroni, Italian footballer (d. 1967)
  1943   – Pablo Milanés, Cuban singer-songwriter and guitarist
1944 – Nicky Hopkins, English keyboard player (d. 1994)
  1944   – Ivica Račan, Croatian lawyer and politician, 7th Prime Minister of Croatia (d. 2007)
1945 – Barry Bostwick, American actor and singer
1946 – Grigory Margulis, Russian mathematician and academic
1947 – Rupert Holmes, English-American singer-songwriter and playwright
  1947   – Edward James Olmos, American actor and director
1948 – Jayalalithaa, Indian actress and politician, 16th Chief Minister of Tamil Nadu (d. 2016)
  1948   – Dennis Waterman, English actor (d. 2022)
1950 – George Thorogood, American musician
1951 – David Ford, Northern Irish social worker and politician
  1951   – Derek Randall, English cricketer
  1951   – Debra Jo Rupp, American actress
  1951   – Helen Shaver, Canadian actress and director
  1951   – Laimdota Straujuma, Latvian economist and politician, 12th Prime Minister of Latvia
1953 – Anatoli Kozhemyakin, Soviet footballer (d. 1974)
1954 – Plastic Bertrand, Belgian singer-songwriter and producer 
  1954   – Judith Ortiz Cofer, Puerto Rican American award-winning author (d. 2016)
  1954   – Aurora Levins Morales, Puerto Rican Jewish writer and activist
  1954   – Sid Meier, Canadian-American game designer and programmer, created the Civilization series
  1954   – Mike Pickering, English DJ and saxophonist
1955 – Steve Jobs, American businessman, co-founded Apple Computer and Pixar (d. 2011)
  1955   – Eddie Johnson, American basketball player (d. 2020)
  1955   – Alain Prost, French race car driver
1956 – Judith Butler, American philosopher, theorist, and author
  1956   – Eddie Murray, American baseball player and coach
  1956   – Paula Zahn, American journalist and producer
1958 – Sammy Kershaw, American singer-songwriter and guitarist
  1958   – Mark Moses, American actor
1959 – Beth Broderick, American actress and director
  1959   – Mike Whitney, Australian cricketer and television host
1962 – Kelly Craft, US Ambassador to the United Nations and US Ambassador to Canada
1963 – Prince Carlo, Duke of Castro
  1963   – Mike Vernon, Canadian ice hockey player
  1963   – Sanjay Leela Bhansali, Indian filmmaker
1964 – Russell Ingall, British-Australian race car driver and sportscaster
1965 – Paul Gruber, American football player
  1965   – Jane Swift, American businesswoman and politician, Governor of Massachusetts
1966 – Billy Zane, American actor and producer
1967 – Brian Schmidt, Australian astrophysicist and academic, Nobel Prize laureate
1968 – Mitch Hedberg, American comedian and actor (d. 2005)
1969 – Kim Seung-woo, South Korean actor
1970 – Jeff Garcia, American football player and coach
  1970   – Neil Sullivan, English born Scottish international footballer and coach
  1970   – Jonathan Ward, American actor
1971 – Pedro de la Rosa, Spanish race car driver
1972 – Teodor Currentzis, Greek conductor and composer
  1972   – Manon Rhéaume, Canadian ice hockey player and coach
1973 – Stubby Clapp, Canadian baseball player and coach
  1973   – Alexei Kovalev, Russian ice hockey player and pilot
1975 – Ashley MacIsaac, Canadian singer-songwriter and fiddler
1976 – Zach Johnson, American golfer
  1976   – Bradley McGee, Australian cyclist and coach
  1976   – Marco Campos, Brazilian race car driver (d. 1995)
1977 – Jason Akermanis, Australian footballer and coach
  1977   – Floyd Mayweather Jr., American boxer
1980 – Shinsuke Nakamura, Japanese wrestler and mixed martial artist
1981 – Felipe Baloy, Panamanian footballer
  1981   – Lleyton Hewitt, Australian tennis player
  1981   – Mohammad Sami, Pakistani cricketer
1982 – Nick Blackburn, American baseball player
  1982   – Emanuel Villa, Argentinian footballer
  1982   – Klára Koukalová, Czech tennis player
  1982   – Fala Chen, Chinese actress and singer
1984 – Corey Graves, American wrestler and sportscaster
1985 – Nakash Aziz, Indian playback singer and composer
1987 – Kim Kyu-jong, South Korean singer, dancer, and actor 
1988 – Connie Ramsay, Scottish judoka
1989 – Trace Cyrus, American singer-songwriter and guitarist 
  1989   – Daniel Kaluuya, English actor
1991 – Madison Hubbell, American ice dancer
  1991   – O'Shea Jackson Jr., American actor and rapper
  1991   – Semih Kaya, Turkish footballer
1994 – Jessica Pegula, American tennis player
  1994   – Earl Sweatshirt, American rapper
1996 – Royce Freeman, American football player

Deaths

Pre-1600
 616 – Æthelberht of Kent (b. 560)
 951 – Liu Yun, Chinese governor (jiedushi)
1018 – Borrell, bishop of Vic
1114 – Thomas, archbishop of York
1386 – Charles III of Naples (b. 1345)
1496 – Eberhard I, Duke of Württemberg (b. 1445)
1525 – Jacques de La Palice, French nobleman and military officer (b. 1470)
  1525   – Guillaume Gouffier, seigneur de Bonnivet, French soldier (b. c. 1488)
  1525   – Richard de la Pole, last Yorkist claimant to the English throne (b. 1480)
1530 – Properzia de' Rossi, Italian Renaissance sculptor
1563 – Francis, Duke of Guise (b. 1519)
1580 – Henry FitzAlan, 19th Earl of Arundel, English nobleman (b. 1511)
1588 – Johann Weyer, Dutch physician and occultist (b. 1515)

1601–1900
1666 – Nicholas Lanier, English composer and painter (b. 1588)
1685 – Charles Howard, 1st Earl of Carlisle, English general and politician, Lord Lieutenant of Cumberland (b. 1629)
1704 – Marc-Antoine Charpentier, French composer (b. 1643)
1714 – Edmund Andros, English courtier and politician, 4th Colonial Governor of New York (b. 1637)
1721 – John Sheffield, 1st Duke of Buckingham and Normanby, English poet and politician, Lord President of the Council (b. 1648)
1732 – Francis Charteris, Scottish soldier (b. 1675)
1777 – Joseph I of Portugal (b. 1714)
1785 – Carlo Buonaparte, Corsican lawyer and politician (b. 1746)
1799 – Georg Christoph Lichtenberg, German physicist and academic (b. 1742)
1810 – Henry Cavendish, French-English physicist and chemist (b. 1731)
1812 – Étienne-Louis Malus, French physicist and mathematician (b. 1775)
1815 – Robert Fulton, American engineer (b. 1765)
1825 – Thomas Bowdler, English physician and philanthropist (b. 1754)
1856 – Nikolai Lobachevsky, Russian mathematician and academic (b. 1792)
1876 – Joseph Jenkins Roberts, American-Liberian politician, 1st President of Liberia (b. 1809)
1879 – Shiranui Kōemon, Japanese sumo wrestler, the 11th Yokozuna (b. 1825)

1901–present
1910 – Osman Hamdi Bey, Turkish archaeologist and painter (b. 1842)
1914 – Joshua Chamberlain, American general and politician, 32nd Governor of Maine (b. 1828)
1925 – Hjalmar Branting, Swedish journalist and politician, 16th Prime Minister of Sweden, Nobel Prize laureate (b. 1860)
1927 – Edward Marshall Hall, English lawyer and politician (b. 1858)
1929 – André Messager, French pianist, composer, and conductor (b. 1853)
1930 – Hermann von Ihering, German-Brazilian zoologist (b. 1850)
1953 – Robert La Follette Jr., American politician, senator of Wisconsin (b. 1895)
  1953   – Gerd von Rundstedt, German field marshal (b. 1875)
1967 – Mir Osman Ali Khan, Last Nizam of Hyderabad State (b. 1886)
1970 – Conrad Nagel, American actor (b. 1897)
1974 – Margaret Leech, American historian and author (b. 1895)
1975 – Hans Bellmer, German artist (b. 1902)
  1975   – Nikolai Bulganin, Russian marshal and politician, 6th Premier of the Soviet Union (b. 1895)
1978 – Alma Thomas, American painter and educator (b.1891)
1982 – Virginia Bruce, American actress (b. 1910)
1986 – Rukmini Devi Arundale, Indian Bharatnatyam dancer (b. 1904)
  1986   – Tommy Douglas, Scottish-Canadian minister and politician, 7th Premier of Saskatchewan (b. 1904)
1990 – Tony Conigliaro, American baseball player (b. 1945)
  1990   – Malcolm Forbes, American sergeant and publisher (b. 1917)
  1990   – Sandro Pertini, Italian journalist and politician, 7th President of Italy (b. 1896)
  1990   – Johnnie Ray, American singer-songwriter and pianist (b. 1927)
1991 – John Daly, American journalist and game show host (b. 1914)
  1991   – George Gobel, American actor (b. 1919)
  1991   – Webb Pierce, American singer-songwriter and guitarist (b. 1921)
1993 – Danny Gallivan, Canadian sportscaster (b. 1917)
  1993   – Bobby Moore, English footballer and manager (b. 1941)
1994 – Jean Sablon, French singer and actor (b. 1906)
  1994   – Dinah Shore, American actress and singer (b. 1916)
1998 – Antonio Prohías, Cuban-American cartoonist (b. 1921)
  1998   – Henny Youngman, English-American comedian and violinist (b. 1906)
1999 – Andre Dubus, American short story writer, essayist, and memoirist (b. 1936)
2001 – Theodore Marier, American composer and educator, founded the Boston Archdiocesan Choir School (b. 1912)
  2001   – Claude Shannon, American mathematician, cryptographer, and engineer (b. 1916)
2002 – Leo Ornstein, Ukrainian-American pianist and composer (b. 1893)
2004 – John Randolph, American actor (b. 1915)
2005 – Coşkun Kırca, Turkish diplomat, journalist and politician (b. 1927)
2006 – Octavia E. Butler, American author and educator (b. 1947)
  2006   – Don Knotts, American actor and comedian (b. 1924)
  2006   – John Martin, Canadian broadcaster, co-founded MuchMusic (b. 1947)
  2006   – Dennis Weaver, American actor, director, and producer (b. 1924)
2007 – Bruce Bennett, American shot putter and actor (b. 1906)
  2007   – Damien Nash, American football player (b. 1982)
2008 – Larry Norman, American singer-songwriter and producer (b. 1947)
2010 – Dawn Brancheau, senior animal trainer at SeaWorld (b. 1969)
2011 – Anant Pai, Indian author and illustrator (b. 1929)
2012 – Agnes Allen, American baseball player and therapist (b. 1930)
  2012   – Oliver Wrong, English nephrologist and academic (b. 1925)
2013 – Virgil Johnson, American singer (b. 1935)
  2013   – Con Martin, Irish footballer and manager (b. 1923)
2014 – Franny Beecher, American guitarist (b. 1921)
  2014   – Alexis Hunter, New Zealand-English painter and photographer (b. 1948)
  2014   – Carlos Páez Vilaró, Uruguayan painter and sculptor (b. 1923)
  2014   – Harold Ramis, American actor, director, producer, and screenwriter (b. 1944)
2015 – Mefodiy, Ukrainian metropolitan (b. 1949)
  2015   – Rakhat Aliyev, Kazakh politician and diplomat (b. 1962)
2016 – Peter Kenilorea, Solomon Islands politician, 1st Prime Minister of the Solomon Islands (b. 1943)
  2016   – Nabil Maleh, Syrian director, producer, and screenwriter (b. 1936)
  2016   – George C. Nichopoulos, American soldier and physician (b. 1927)
2018 – Sridevi, Indian actress (b. 1963)
  2018   – Haukur Hilmarsson, Icelandic political activist and internationalist volunteer fighter (b. 1986)
2020 – Katherine Johnson, American physicist and mathematician (b. 1918)
2021 – Ronald Pickup, English actor (b. 1940)

Holidays and observances
Christian feast day:
Blessed Ascensión Nicol y Goñi
Lindel Tsen and Paul Sasaki (Anglican Church of Canada)
Modest (bishop of Trier)
Sergius of Cappadocia
February 24 (Eastern Orthodox liturgics)
Dragobete (Romania)
Engineer's Day (Iran)
Flag Day in Mexico
Independence Day, celebrates the independence of Estonia from the Russian Empire in 1918; the Soviet period is considered to have been an illegal annexation.
National Artist Day (Thailand)
Sweden Finns' Day (Sweden)

References

External links

 BBC: On This Day
 
 Historical Events on February 24

Days of the year
February